Events in the year 2022 in São Tomé and Príncipe.

Incumbents 
 President: Carlos Vila Nova
 Prime Minister: Jorge Bom Jesus

Events 
Ongoing — COVID-19 pandemic in São Tomé and Príncipe

 25 September – 2022 São Toméan legislative election
 24-25 November - 2022 São Tomé and Príncipe coup d'état attempt: São Tomé and Príncipe prime minister Patrice Trovoada reports that his officials had thwarted a coup d'état attempt led by the President of the National Assembly, Delfim Neves, after they arrested Neves and another individual for infiltrating the headquarters of the armed forces in São Tomé. Four people were killed in the attempt.

Deaths 
 28 May –  Evaristo Carvalho, politician (born 1941)

See also 

 List of years in São Tomé and Príncipe

References 

 
Sao Tome and Principe
Sao Tome and Principe
2020s in São Tomé and Príncipe
Years of the 21st century in São Tomé and Príncipe